Mike Smithson (born 26 November) is a political reporter and presenter for Seven News in Adelaide, South Australia, Australia and can be heard on Adelaide radio station FIVEaa discussing political events with Leon Byner.

Career
Smithson started his career in print media with Messenger Newspapers in the mid 1970s. He later moved to television joining the Seven News in Adelaide, later becoming the senior police reporter with Seven News in Melbourne. Mike returned to Adelaide and became Network Ten's first weekend newsreader before becoming a bureau chief with the Hinch and Real Life programs. He has previously been brief host of Today Tonight Adelaide and European Correspondent.

Some of his biggest reporting stories have included the infamous Skase Chase, the 2000 Summer Olympics and the War on Terror in Afghanistan.

In 2007, Smithson won 3 awards at the SA Media Awards: the inaugural award for Commentary, Analysis, Opinion & Critique for his work with the Sunday Mail, Best TV news report and the prestigious title of Journalist of the Year.

Mike is a regular fill in presenter on 5AA.

Personal life
Smithson is married to Fiona and they have two children, Matt and Emma.

Mike's wife Fiona is the sister of retired Seven News presenter John Riddell

External links
 Seven News website

Year of birth missing (living people)
Living people
Australian television journalists